Claes Nyberg (born 3 March 1971) is a Swedish former long-distance runner who competes mostly in cross country running. His highest international achievement was a silver medal at the 1997 European Cross Country Championships. He made seven appearances at the IAAF World Cross Country Championships between 1989 and 2002, with his best placing of 33rd coming both 2000 and 2001. He was Sweden's leading cross country runner during his career.

Nyberg won fourteen individual national titles during his career. He was a perennial runner-up at the Nordic Cross Country Championships, taking the second spot on five occasions between 1997 and 2002. He finally won the Nordic title in 2004. He also twice represented Sweden at the European Athletics Championships, running the 10,000 metres in 1998 and 2002.

International competitions

National titles
Swedish Athletics Championships
5000 m: 1994, 1996
10,000 m: 1995, 2000, 2001
Swedish Cross Country Championships
Short race: 1996, 1997, 1998, 1999, 2000, 2001, 2002
Long race: 1995
Swedish Indoor Championships
1500 m: 1993

References

External links

Living people
1971 births
Swedish male long-distance runners